Man from Rainbow Valley is a 1946 American Western Magnacolor film directed by R. G. Springsteen and written by Betty Burbridge. The film stars Monte Hale, Lorna Gray, Jo Ann Marlowe, Ferris Taylor, Emmett Lynn and Tom London. The film was released on June 15, 1946, by Republic Pictures.

Plot

Cast  
Monte Hale as Monte Hale
Lorna Gray as Kay North 
Jo Ann Marlowe as Ginny Hale
Ferris Taylor as Colonel Winthrop
Emmett Lynn as Locoweed
Tom London as Healey
Bud Geary as Tracy
Kenne Duncan as Lafe
Doye O'Dell as Ranch Hand Jim
Bert Roach as Mayor
Enright Busse as Musician 
John Scott as Musician 
Frank Wilder as Musician

References

External links 
 

1946 films
American Western (genre) films
1946 Western (genre) films
Republic Pictures films
Films directed by R. G. Springsteen
1940s English-language films
1940s American films